The voiceless bilabial trill is a type of consonantal sound, used in some spoken languages. The X-SAMPA symbol is B\_0

This sound is typologically extremely rare. It occurs in languages such as Pará Arára and Sercquiais.

Only a few languages contrast voiced and voiceless bilabial trills phonemically – e.g. Mangbetu of Congo and Ninde of Vanuatu.

There is also a very rare voiceless alveolar bilabially trilled affricate,  (written  in Everett & Kern) reported from Pirahã and from a few words in the Chapacuran languages Wariʼ and Oro Win. The sound also appears as an allophone of the labialized voiceless alveolar stop  of Abkhaz and Ubykh, but in those languages it is more often realised by a doubly articulated stop .

Features
Features of the bilabial trill:

Occurrence

Notes

Trill consonants
Pulmonic consonants
Voiceless oral consonants
Bilabial consonants